Will Hobson is an American journalist and the recipient of the 2014 Pulitzer Prize for Local Reporting.

Early life and career
Hobson was born in Philadelphia, Pennsylvania in 1984. He attended Boston College where he wrote op-eds for the student newspaper The Heights. He graduated in 2006 with a bachelor's degree in English. Hobson interned at Philadelphia magazine in 2006. He has worked as an investigative reporter for the Tampa Bay Times, the News Herald and The Daytona Beach News-Journal. In 2014, he was awarded a Pulitzer Prize for his exposé on Tampa's homeless housing program. He works as a sports reporter for The Washington Post.

Awards
2014 Pulitzer Prize for Local Reporting (with Mike LaForgia)

References

Pulitzer Prize winners
American male journalists
Boston College alumni
Living people
1984 births